Herbert Mosenthal (8 June 1866 – 12 October 1904) was a South African first-class cricketer. He played for Transvaal in the 1889–90 Currie Cup.

References

External links
 

1866 births
1904 deaths
South African cricketers
Gauteng cricketers
Cricketers from Greater London